The 1997 Intercontinental Final was the nineteenth running of the Intercontinental Final and was the second last qualifying stage for Motorcycle speedway riders to qualify for the 1998 Speedway Grand Prix series. The Final was run on 26 July at the Västervik Speedway in Västervik, Sweden

Intercontinental Final
 26 July
  Västervik, Västervik Speedway
 Top 2 to 1998 Speedway Grand Prix
 Riders 3-7 plus 1 reserve to GP Challenge

References

1997
World Individual
International sports competitions hosted by Sweden